Langenlonsheim Airfield (or Flugplatz Langenlonsheim in German) is a small airfield in Langenlonsheim, Germany. It has a single grass runway in the direction 01 / 19 with a length of 450 meters (1,476 feet). Prior permission is required for visiting aircraft.

See also

 Transport in Germany
 List of airports in Germany

External links
 Official website

Airports in Rhineland-Palatinate
Bad Kreuznach (district)